Vinay Kumar (Born Dec 24, 1944, India) is the Lowell T. Coggeshall Distinguished Service Professor of Pathology at the University of Chicago, where he was also the Chairman (2000-2016) of the Department of Pathology. He is a recipient of Life Time Achievement Award by National Board of Examinations.

Biography
Dr. Vinay Kumar was born in a town named Okara, about 100 miles from Lahore in undivided India on December 24, 1944. He graduated with honors, at the age of 17, from Savitribai Phule Pune University. He earned his MBBS in 1967, at the age of 22, from Glancy Medical College present day Government medical college in Amritsar, where he was named "Best Medical Graduate" for that year, winning the Pfizer Award and the gold medal for highest achievement as a medical student. He completed both his PhD in experimental pathology and his residency in anatomic pathology and hematology in 1972 at the All India Institute of Medical Sciences, where he was awarded the Khanolkar Prize for outstanding research in pathology.

He was one of the inaugural co-editors of the Annual Review of Pathology: Mechanisms of Disease in 2006.
He has been the senior editor of the pathology reference book Robbins and Cotran Pathologic Basis of Disease co-edited with Dr. Abul K. Abbas.

Since 2003, Kumar is a Fellow of the American Association for the Advancement of Science (AAAS).

He is credited with the discovery of Natural killer (NK) cells in immunology.

Awards and honours

 2018: The Gold-Headed Cane Award by the American Society for Investigative Pathology
 2014: Life Time Achievement Award by National Board of Examinations
 2009: American Society for Investigative Pathology (ASIP) Robbins Distinguished Educator Award

Selected books

References

1944 births
Living people
Indian pathologists
Indian hematologists
Indian emigrants to the United States
American medical academics
American pathologists
Savitribai Phule Pune University alumni
All India Institute of Medical Sciences, New Delhi alumni
University of Chicago faculty
American people of Indian descent in health professions
Fellows of the American Association for the Advancement of Science
Annual Reviews (publisher) editors